Conflans may refer to:

Communes 
Conflans is the name or part of the name of ten communes of France:
Conflans-en-Jarnisy in the Meurthe-et-Moselle département
Conflans-Sainte-Honorine in the Yvelines département, in the north-western suburbs of Paris
Conflans-sur-Anille in the Sarthe département
Conflans-sur-Lanterne in the Haute-Saône département
Conflans-sur-Loing in the Loiret département
Conflans-sur-Seine in the Marne département
Abbéville-lès-Conflans in the Meurthe-et-Moselle département
Bourguignon-lès-Conflans in the Haute-Saône département
Dampierre-lès-Conflans in the Haute-Saône département
Doncourt-lès-Conflans in the Meurthe-et-Moselle département

Other places 
Conflans, a medieval town that is part of the commune of Albertville in Savoie
Conflans, a district of Charenton-le-Pont, a commune in the southeastern suburbs of Paris; after which the Treaty of Conflans is named

People
 Hubert de Brienne, Comte de Conflans, French military officer active in India during the eighteenth century

In history 

 Treaty of Conflans, signed in 1465 between King Louis XI of France and Count Charles of Charolais